Notarcha pactolica is a moth in the family Crambidae. It was described by Arthur Gardiner Butler in 1887. It is found in the Solomon Islands.

References

Moths described in 1887
Spilomelinae